Mahamantri Timmarusu is a 1962 Indian Telugu-language historical drama film directed by Kamalakara Kameswara Rao. It stars N. T. Rama Rao, Devika and Gummadi, with music composed by Pendyala Nageswara Rao. The film was produced by N. Ramabrahmam, A. Pundarikakshayya under the Gowtami Productions banner. The film won the President's silver medal for Best Feature Film in Telugu at the 10th National Film Awards.

Plot
The story is about the critical role of Timmarusu (Gummadi) played during the reign of Sri Krishnadevaraya (NTR). The story begins with the crowning ceremony of Sri Krishnadevaraya. Before the function, he participates in the dance and music function of Chinna Devi (Vijayalaxmi). They get married and she becomes his first queen.

After the coronation, Timmarusu arranges the marriage with Tirumala Devi (S. Varalaxmi), daughter of the Srirangapatnam kingdom. The Vijayanagara empire expands in size due to the war tactics of Pemmasani Ramalinga Nayaka (Mikkilineni). Timmarusu slaps him on the cheek to remind him about the kickbacks while seating on the crown. He plans to attack Gajapathis of the Kalinga kingdom alone. Knowing about this, Timmarusu reaches Kalinga and protects him.

Pratap Rudra Gajapathi (Mukkamala) wanted to kill him with the help of his son Veerabhadra Gajapathi (Prabhakar Reddy). However, his daughter Annapurna Devi (Devika) is openly opposed to the plan since she is in love with Krishnadevaraya. In political dialogue, Prataparudra agrees to marry his daughter to Krishnadevaraya. Prataparudra tries to assassinate Krishnadevaraya immediately after the marriage. Krishandevaraya escapes with the help of Timmarusu.

Krishnadevaraya, Timmarusu, and Annapurna Devi along with Hamvira (Lingamurthy) reach Hampi. Annapurna gives birth to Tirumala Raya. Hamvira creates differences between Krishnadevaraya and Timmarusu. He assassinates Tirumala Raya and frames Timmarusu and convinces Krishnadevaraya that Timmarusu is the real culprit. The court, on the instructions from Krishnadevaraya, orders the plucking of Timarusu's eyes and imprisoning him. Before Rayalu knows the fact, the punishment is implemented. However, Timmarusu pardons him and their relationship continues.

Cast
N. T. Rama Rao as Sri Krishnadeva Rayalu
Devika as Annapurna Devi
Gummadi as Mahamantri Timmarusu
Relangi as Rajguru Tathacharyalu
Mikkilineni as Ramalinga Nayakudu
Mukkamala as Pratapa Rudra Gajapati
Dhulipala as Allasani Peddana
Mudigonda Lingamurthy as Hamvira
Prabhakar Reddy as Veerabhadra Gajapati
Shobhan Babu as Govinda Rayalu
S. Varalakshmi as Tirumala Devi
L. Vijayalakshmi as Chinna Devi 
Rajasree as Kandoli
Radha Kumari as Krishnaveni

Soundtrack

Music composed by Pendyala Nageswara Rao. Lyrics were written by Pingali Nagendra Rao. Music released on Audio Company.

Awards
National Film Awards
 1962: President's silver medal for Best Feature Film in Telugu

References

External links
 

1962 films
1960s Telugu-language films
Indian biographical drama films
Films directed by Kamalakara Kameswara Rao
1960s biographical drama films
Films scored by Pendyala Nageswara Rao
Best Telugu Feature Film National Film Award winners
Films set in the Vijayanagara Empire